Louis André Saillant (27 November 1910 – 28 October 1974) was a French trade unionist and resistance fighter.

Born in Valance, Saillant worked as a cabinet maker.  He became active in the General Confederation of Labour (CGT), becoming secretary of its Building and Woodworkers' Federation.  In 1940, the Vichy government outlawed trade unions, but the CGT continued, illegally, in support of the French Resistance.  Saillant was a signatory to the Manifesto of the Twelve, in which twelve leading trade unionists publicly opposed Vichy policy, and was also active in Libération-Nord.

In 1943, the CGT was a founding element of the National Council of the Resistance (CNR), and Saillant became its delegate to the CNR, taking over as chair of the resistance in 1944.

After World War II, Saillant was elected as the general secretary of the World Federation of Trade Unions (WFTU).  When the right-wing split away from the CGT, he supported the generally communist majority, but thereafter devoted his time to the WFTU.

Saillant denounced the 1968 invasion of Czechoslovakia.  He resigned as leader of the WFTU shortly afterwards, blaming health problems, and was instead made honorary president of the federation.  He was also president of the World Peace Movement, and won the Lenin Prize.

References

External links
 

1910 births
1974 deaths
French trade unionists
French Resistance members